Jeffrey Lynne  (born 30 December 1947) is an English musician, singer-songwriter, and record producer. He is best known as the co-founder of the rock band Electric Light Orchestra (ELO), which was formed in 1970. As a songwriter, he has contributed a number of hits to the repertoire of ELO, including "Evil Woman", "Livin' Thing", "Telephone Line", "Mr. Blue Sky", "Don't Bring Me Down", and "Hold On Tight".

Lynne was born in Birmingham and became interested in music during his youth, being heavily inspired by the Beatles. He began his music career in 1963 as a member of the Andicaps, leaving the group a year later to join the Chads. From 1966 to 1970, Lynne was a founding member and principal songwriter for the Idle Race. In 1970, Lynne accepted Roy Wood's offer to join the Move, with Lynne contributing heavily to the band's last two albums. Later that year, Lynne and Wood disbanded the Move to form the band ELO, which was formed out of Lynne's and Wood's desire to create modern rock and pop songs with classical overtones. Following Wood's departure from ELO in 1972, Lynne assumed sole leadership of the band and wrote, arranged, and produced virtually all of its subsequent records.

During the 1970s and 1980s, ELO released a string of top 10 albums and singles, including the band's most commercially successful album, the double album Out of the Blue (1977). Two ELO albums reached the top of British charts: the disco-inspired Discovery (1979) and the science fiction–themed concept album Time (1981). After ELO's original disbandment in 1986, Lynne released two solo albums: Armchair Theatre (1990) and Long Wave (2012). Additionally, he began producing various artists. In 1988, under the pseudonyms Otis Wilbury and Clayton Wilbury, he co-founded the supergroup Traveling Wilburys with George Harrison, Bob Dylan, Roy Orbison, and Tom Petty. In the 1990s, Lynne co-produced the Beatles' Anthology reunion singles from John Lennon demos, "Free as a Bird" (1995) and "Real Love" (1996). In 2014, Lynne reformed ELO and resumed concert touring under the name "Jeff Lynne's ELO".

Lynne produced all fifteen ELO singles that rose to the Top 10 record charts in the UK. Outside of ELO, Lynne's producing credits include the UK or US Top 10 albums Cloud Nine (Harrison, 1987), Mystery Girl (Orbison, 1989), Full Moon Fever (Petty, 1989), Into the Great Wide Open (Tom Petty and the Heartbreakers, 1991), Flaming Pie (Paul McCartney, 1997), and Get Up! (Bryan Adams, 2015). In 2014, Lynne received a star on the Birmingham Walk of Stars, and was awarded a star on the Hollywood Walk of Fame the following year. He received three Ivor Novello Awards, including the award for Outstanding Services to British Music. In 2017, Lynne was inducted into the Rock and Roll Hall of Fame as a member of ELO, and was appointed Officer of the Order of the British Empire in 2020.

Musical career

Early life and career
Lynne was born in Erdington, Birmingham, to Nancy and Philip Lynne and grew up in Shard End, Birmingham, England, where he attended Alderlea Boys' Secondary School. As a native of Birmingham, he still has his Brummie accent. His father bought him his first guitar, an acoustic instrument, for £2. He was still playing it in 2012. In 1963, he formed a group with Robert Reader and David Walsh using little more than Spanish guitars and cheap electrical instruments. They were originally named the Rockin' Hellcats, then the Handicaps and finally the Andicaps. They practised at Shard End Community Centre and performed weekly. However, in 1964, Robert Reader and David Walsh left the band and Lynne brought in replacements. At the end of 1964, Lynne decided to leave the band to replace Mick Adkins of the local band "the Chads".

Some time in or after 1965, he acquired his first item of studio recording equipment, a Bang & Olufsen 'Beocord 2000 De Luxe' stereo reel-to-reel tape recorder, which allowed multi-tracking between left and right channels. He says it "taught me how to be a producer". In 1966, Lynne joined the line-up of the Nightriders as guitarist, having responded to an advertisement in the Birmingham Evening Mail.

The band soon changed their name to the Idle Race. Despite recording two critically acclaimed albums with the band and producing the second, success eluded him. In 1970, Lynne accepted an offer from friend Roy Wood to join the line-up of the more successful band the Move.

1970–1986: The Move and ELO 

Lynne contributed many songs to the Move's last two albums while formulating, with Roy Wood and Bev Bevan, a band built around a fusion of rock and classical music – a project which would eventually become the Electric Light Orchestra (ELO). The original idea was that both bands would exist in tandem. Bevan has, however, since suggested that Lynne had little interest in the Move, stating: "The only reason Jeff Lynne ever joined the Move was to form a new band. He was never interested in being a part of the Move."

The band's eponymous first album was released in December 1971, featuring heavy contributions from Lynne and Wood and producing the band's debut single "10538 Overture". Problems led to Wood's departure from ELO in 1972 (forming the band Wizzard later that year), a year after the release of the band's first album, leaving Lynne as the band's dominant creative force. Thereafter followed a succession of band personnel changes and increasingly popular albums: ELO 2 (1973) and On the Third Day (also 1973), Eldorado (1974) and Face the Music (1975). By A New World Record (1976), Lynne had almost developed the roots of the group into a more complex and unique pop-rock sound mixed with studio strings, layered vocals, and tight, catchy pop singles. Lynne's now almost complete creative dominance as producer, songwriter, arranger, lead singer and guitarist could make ELO appear to be an almost solo effort. However, the ELO sound and the focus of Lynne's writing was also shaped by Louis Clark's and Richard Tandy's co-arranging, under Lynne's direction (especially the large string sections in addition to ELO's own string trio), and Bev Bevan's drumming, while Richard Tandy's integration of the piano, Moog, harmonium, and Mellotron, with more novel keyboard technology, gave Lynne's songs a more symphonic sound. Bassist Kelly Groucutt's distinctive voice mixed with Lynne's to produce the classic ELO harmonic vocal sound.

The pinnacle of ELO's chart success and worldwide popularity was the expansive double album Out of the Blue (1977), which was largely conceived in a Swiss chalet during a two-week writing marathon. The band's 1978 world tour featured an elaborate "space ship" set and laser light show. In order to recreate the complex instrumental textures of their albums, the band used pre-recorded supplemental backing tracks in live performances. Although that practice has now become commonplace, it caused considerable derision in the press of the time. Lynne has often stated that he prefers the creative environment of the studio to the rigours and tedium of touring. Lynne followed up the success of Out of the Blue with Discovery (1979), which held No. 1 in the UK for 5 weeks. The album is primarily associated with its two disco-flavoured singles ("Shine a Little Love" and "Last Train to London") and with the title's word play on "disco" and "very". However, the remaining seven non-disco tracks on the album reflected Lynne's range as a pop-rock songwriter, including a heavy, mid-tempo rock anthem ("Don't Bring Me Down") that, despite its use of a drum loop, could be considered the antithesis of disco. Lynne later recalled his forays into dance music: "I love the force of disco. I love the freedom it gave me to make  different rhythms across it. I enjoyed that really steady driving beat. Just steady as a rock. I’ve always liked that simplicity in the bass drum."

In 1979, Lynne rejected an offer for ELO to headline the Knebworth Concert in the UK, allowing Led Zeppelin to headline instead. In the absence of any touring to support Discovery, Lynne had time to contribute five tracks to the soundtrack for the 1980 film musical Xanadu. The score yielded three Top 20 singles for ELO in both the UK and the US: "I'm Alive" (UK No. 20, US No. 16), "All Over The World" (UK No. 11, US No. 13), and the title track "Xanadu", featuring Olivia Newton-John joining ELO on lead vocals, which reached number one in the UK (US No. 8). Nevertheless, Lynne was not closely involved with the development of the film, and his material consequently had only superficial attachment to the plot. Xanadu performed weakly at the box office (although it later has experienced popularity as a cult favourite). Lynne subsequently disavowed his limited contribution to the project.

Lynne took the band in a somewhat different direction with the science-fiction themed album Time (1981), reaching number one for two weeks in the UK, producing the second Top 3 single in less than two years. The strings were still featured, but with heavily synthesised textures. Following a marginally successful tour, Lynne kept this general approach with Secret Messages (1983) and a final contractually-obligated ELO album Balance of Power (1986). Lynne discusses the contractually-obligated nature of the final albums on the short interview included with the 'Zoom' DVD. ELO now had only three remaining official members (Lynne, Bevan and Tandy), and Lynne began devoting more time to producing. During his time in the Electric Light Orchestra, Lynne had managed to release a few recordings under his own name. In 1976, Lynne covered the Beatles songs "With a Little Help from My Friends" and "Nowhere Man" for All This and World War II. In 1977, Lynne released his first solo single, the disco-flavoured "Doin' That Crazy Thing"/"Goin' Down to Rio". Despite ELO's high-profile at that time, it received little airplay and failed to chart.

In 1984, Lynne and Tandy contributed two original songs "Video!" and "Let It Run" to the film Electric Dreams (they also provided a third song, "Sooner Or Later", which was released as the b-side of "Video!"). Lynne also wrote the song "The Story of Me," which was recorded by the Everly Brothers on their comeback album EB84. Even before the official end of ELO, Lynne began his move toward focusing almost exclusively on studio production work. Lynne produced and wrote the 1983 top-40 hit "Slipping Away" for Dave Edmunds and played on sessions (with Tandy) for Edmunds's album, Information. Lynne also produced six tracks on Edmunds's follow-up album in 1984, Riff Raff. In contrast to the dense, boomy, baroque sound of ELO, Lynne's post-ELO studio work has tended toward more minimal, acoustic instrumentation and a sparse, "organic" quality that generally favours light room ambience and colouration over artificial reverb, especially on vocals. Lynne's recordings also often feature the jangling compressed acoustic guitar sound pioneered by Roger McGuinn and a heavily gated snare drum sound.

1980s–1990s: Collaborations with the Beatles 

During the 1980s and 1990s, Lynne collaborated on various projects with former members of the Beatles. The band had been a major influence on Lynne since the release of their debut album, Please Please Me, in 1963, and have continued to influence him throughout his career to date.

In 1968, while performing with The Idle Race, Lynne and the other members of the band were invited to a Beatles session at Abbey Road Studios. While there, he met the Beatles during the making of The White Album, witnessing the band making it together. He spent an hour at the session, before going back to the sessions with the Idle Race. Years later, he admitted that being in the same room "caused me not to sleep for, like, three days." The original aim of Electric Light Orchestra was to take up "where the Beatles had left off, and to present it on stage." John Lennon praised the group, calling them the "sons of the Beatles" on a radio station when discussing the group's 1973 single "Showdown" on the New York radio station WNEW.

Critics often compared Electric Light Orchestra to The Beatles, and they were often criticised for "ripping off" the band. Lynne admitted that he "was very influenced by the Beatles' sound of '68 and '69. That has obviously been a big influence on the way [he] looked at songwriting" and said that being compared with The Beatles was the "ultimate compliment".

1987–1991: Traveling Wilburys 
Lynne's Beatles influence was clearly evident in his ELO work, and the connection to the Beatles was strengthened when Lynne produced George Harrison's Cloud Nine. The latter was a successful comeback album for Harrison, released in 1987, featuring the popular singles "Got My Mind Set on You", "When We Was Fab" (appearing in the video) and "This Is Love", the last two of which were co-written by Lynne. Lynne's association with Harrison led to the 1988 formation of the Traveling Wilburys, a studio "supergroup" that also included Tom Petty, Bob Dylan and Roy Orbison and resulted in two albums (Vol. 1 and Vol. 3), both produced by Harrison and Lynne. In 1988, Lynne also worked on Orbison's album Mystery Girl, co-writing and producing Orbison's last major hit, "You Got It", plus two other tracks on that album. For Rock On!, the final Del Shannon album, Lynne co-wrote "Walk Away" and finished off several tracks after Shannon's death.

In 1989, Lynne co-produced Full Moon Fever by Tom Petty, which included the hit singles "Free Fallin'", "I Won't Back Down" and "Runnin' Down a Dream", all co-written by Lynne. This album and Traveling Wilburys Vol. 1 received nominations for the Grammy Award for Best Album of the Year in 1989. The Traveling Wilburys won a Grammy for "Best Rock Performance By a Duo or Group with Vocal" that year. Lynne's song "One Way Love" was released as a single by Agnetha Fältskog and appeared on her second post-ABBA album, Eyes of a Woman. Lynne co-wrote and produced the track "Let It Shine" for Beach Boys founder Brian Wilson's first solo album in 1988. Lynne also contributed three tracks to an album by Duane Eddy and "Falling in Love" on Land of Dreams for Randy Newman.

In 1990, Lynne collaborated on the Wilburys' follow up Traveling Wilburys Vol. 3 and released his first solo album Armchair Theatre. The album featured Harrison and Tandy and included the singles "Every Little Thing" and "Lift Me Up". It received some positive critical attention but little commercial success. Lynne also provided the song "Wild Times" to the motion picture soundtrack Robin Hood: Prince of Thieves in 1991. In 1991, Lynne returned to the studio with Petty, co-writing and producing the album Into the Great Wide Open for Tom Petty and the Heartbreakers, which featured the singles "Learning to Fly" and "Into the Great Wide Open". The following year he produced two songs on Roy Orbison's posthumous album King of Hearts, including the single "I Drove All Night".

1990s–2000s

In February 1994, Lynne worked with the three surviving Beatles on the Anthology album series. At Harrison's request, Lynne was brought in to assist in reevaluating John Lennon's original studio material. The songs "Free as a Bird" and "Real Love" were created by digitally processing Lennon's demos for the songs and overdubbing the three surviving band members to form a virtual Beatles reunion that the band had mutually eschewed during Lennon's lifetime. Lynne has also produced records for Ringo Starr and worked on Paul McCartney's Grammy-nominated album Flaming Pie.

Lynne's work in the 1990s also includes production of a 1993 album for singer-songwriter Julianna Raye titled Something Peculiar and production or songwriting contributions to albums by Roger McGuinn (Back from Rio) and Joe Cocker (Night Calls), songs by Aerosmith ("Lizard Love"), Tom Jones ("Lift Me Up"), Bonnie Tyler ("Time Mends a Broken Heart"), the film Still Crazy, Hank Marvin ("Wonderful Land" and "Nivram"), Et Moi ("Drole De Vie") and the Tandy Morgan Band ("Action"). In 1996, Lynne was officially recognised by his peers when he was awarded the Ivor Novello Award for "Outstanding Contributions to British Music" for a second time.

In the year 2000, Lynne reactivated ELO and released the retrospective box set Flashback, containing many newly finished, previously unreleased tracks. The following year Lynne debuted the first new ELO album in fifteen years, Zoom. The album featured guest appearances by Ringo Starr, George Harrison and Richard Tandy, with Lynne multi-tracking a majority of the instruments and vocals. The album received positive reviews but had no hit singles. It was marketed as a "return to the classic ELO sound" in an attempt to connect with a loyal body of fans and to jump-start a planned concert tour (with Lynne and Tandy as the only returning original ELO members). While a live performance was taped at CBS Television City over two consecutive nights and shown on PBS (with subsequent DVD release), the tour itself was cancelled.

Earlier in 2001, Lynne began working with George Harrison on what would turn out to be Harrison's final album, Brainwashed. After Harrison's death from cancer on 29 November 2001, Lynne returned to the studio in 2002 to help finish the uncompleted album. Lynne was heavily involved in the memorial Concert for George, held at London's Royal Albert Hall in November 2002, which also featured Traveling Wilburys member Petty. Lynne sang the lead vocal on "The Inner Light", "I Want to Tell You" and "Give Me Love (Give Me Peace on Earth)", and subsequently produced the Surround Sound audio mix for the Concert for George DVD, released in November 2003, which later received a Grammy. Lynne reunited in 2006 with Petty to produce the latter's third solo release, Highway Companion. In 2004, Lynne and Petty inducted Harrison into the Rock and Roll Hall of Fame, then played "Handle with Care" with Dhani Harrison, also "While My Guitar Gently Weeps" adding Prince, Steve Winwood, and others.

In a Reuters article on 23 April 2009, Lynne said that he had been working on the follow-up to his 1990 solo debut album Armchair Theatre with a possible tentative release date of "later this year". He also produced four tracks on Regina Spektor's fifth album Far, released 23 June 2009.

2010s
In a March 2010 interview with the Daily Express newspaper, Lynne confirmed he was working on a new album with Joe Walsh and simultaneously "writing a couple of albums under his own name, though he won't tell us in which musical direction he's heading." Lynne contributed a cover of Buddy Holly's "Words of Love" for the tribute album Listen to Me: Buddy Holly, which was released on 6 September 2011. On 31 December 2011, Brian Williams reported on NBC New Year's Eve with Carson Daly that "2012 releases will include rare new work from Jeff Lynne."

In 2012, Walsh released his Analog Man album which was produced by Lynne. Lynne's second solo album, a covers album titled Long Wave, was released on 8 October 2012. A greatest hits collection of re-recorded ELO songs by Lynne titled Mr. Blue Sky: The Very Best of Electric Light Orchestra was also released under the ELO moniker on the same day. Lynne suggested that a new album with original material could be released during 2013. In 2012, Lynne and Tandy teamed up at Lynne's Bungalow Palace home studios to record a live set of ELO's songs. This was broadcast on TV as part of the Mr. Blue Sky documentary. Lynne and Tandy reunited again on 12 November 2013 to perform, under the name Jeff Lynne and Friends, "Livin' Thing" and "Mr. Blue Sky" at the Children in Need Rocks concert at Hammersmith Eventim Apollo, London.

On 9 February 2014, Lynne performed George Harrison's "Something" with Joe Walsh and Dhani Harrison on The Night That Changed America: A Grammy Salute to The Beatles, as well as "Hey Bulldog" from the Yellow Submarine soundtrack, while accompanying Dave Grohl, commemorating the 50th anniversary of the Beatles' performance on The Ed Sullivan Show. On 5 March 2014, Lynne received an honorary doctorate degree from Birmingham City University. He also mentioned he was working with Bryan Adams on new material. On 14 September 2014, Jeff Lynne and his touring band, under the name Jeff Lynne's ELO, played a public concert for the first time in over 25 years, headlining at the Radio 2 festival in Hyde Park, London. Never particularly enthusiastic for live performance even in his younger days, Lynne has called this event "easily the best concert I've ever been involved with".

On 8 February 2015, Lynne appeared at the Grammy Awards, playing "Evil Woman" and "Mr. Blue Sky" with Ed Sheeran.

On 10 September 2015, Lynne's website announced he had signed a contract to deliver an album of new ELO music for Columbia Records marking the first time in 14 years new ELO music would be released. On 24 September 2015, "When I Was a Boy", the first single from Alone in the Universe was released on the internet with a music video scheduled not long after. The album was released on 13 November 2015 and was followed by promotional shows including the first ELO shows in the United States in 30 years. A 2016 European tour was scheduled, with Dublin, Amsterdam and Zurich being some of the locations toured. Notably, the Dublin concert was delayed by a week due to medical advice given to Lynne. In September, 2016, shortly after the European dates, ELO played three shows at the Hollywood Bowl, Los Angeles, with full orchestra and fireworks. Jeff Lynne's ELO also played two concerts at Radio City Music Hall in New York City, on 16 and 18 September 2016 respectively.

On 24 June 2017, Lynne performed at Wembley Stadium to a crowd of 60,000, playing a 24-song setlist including "Xanadu", "Do Ya" and "Twilight". The concert was released on DVD and CD, under the title Wembley or Bust. On 2 August 2018, Lynne and his band Jeff Lynne's ELO began a 10-city tour of North America which included Oakland, California and Los Angeles, Denver, Houston, Dallas, Rosemont, Illinois, Detroit, New York City, Philadelphia and Toronto. On 12 September 2018, Jeff Lynne's ELO began a tour throughout Europe including dates in Stockholm, Oslo, Copenhagen, Hamburg, Berlin, Munich, Mannheim, Vienna, Amsterdam, Nottingham, Glasgow, Manchester, Newcastle upon Tyne, Birmingham, Leeds, London, Liverpool, Dublin, and Belfast. On 20 June 2019, Jeff Lynne's ELO began a North American tour with Dhani Harrison.

On 26 September 2019, Jeff Lynne's ELO announced a new album, called From Out of Nowhere, which was subsequently released on 1 November of the same year. The album was accompanied by the release of an eponymous single which premiered on BBC Radio 2 that same day. The album went to number 1 on the UK Albums Chart.

Personal life
Lynne was married to his first wife Rosemary from 1972 to 1977, and then to Sandi Kapelson, with whom he has two daughters, in 1979. He is a fan of Birmingham City F.C. Lynne married Camelia Kath in 2017 after divorcing Kapelson. Kath, née Ortiz, was previously married to Terry Kath and Kiefer Sutherland. She is the mother of Sarah Sutherland and Michelle Kath.

Lynne was appointed Officer of the Order of the British Empire (OBE) in the 2020 Birthday Honours for services to music.

Awards and honours

 2009: Golden Note Award from the ASCAP
 2013: Songwriters Hall of Fame nominee for 2014 induction
 2014: Star on the Birmingham Walk of Stars
 2014: Honorary doctorate degree from Birmingham City University
 2015: Star on the Hollywood Walk of Fame
 2015: Songwriters Hall of Fame nominee for 2016 induction
 2016: Songwriters Hall of Fame nominee for 2017 induction
 2017: Rock and Roll Hall of Fame inductee as a member of Electric Light Orchestra
 2018: Songwriters Hall of Fame nominee for 2019 induction
 2019: ASCAP Founders Award from the ASCAP
2023: Songwriters Hall of Fame induction.

Solo discography

Studio albums

Compilation albums

Singles

Compilation appearances

Producer discography
See also: The Idle Race discography, the Move discography, Electric Light Orchestra discography, Traveling Wilburys discography

Albums

Co-produced

Soundtracks

Co-produced

Singles
A-sides co-produced

B-sides

B-sides co-produced

References

Bibliography
 Van der Kiste, John Jeff Lynne: The Electric Light Orchestra, before and after, (Stroud: Fonthill Media, 2015)

External links

   
 

 
1947 births
People from Erdington
Living people
20th-century English male singers
20th-century English singers
21st-century English male singers
21st-century English singers
A&R people
British autoharp players
British music arrangers
Electric Light Orchestra members
English composers
English expatriates in the United States
English male guitarists
English male singer-songwriters
English multi-instrumentalists
English record producers
English rock guitarists
English rock singers
Frontiers Records artists
Ivor Novello Award winners
Lead guitarists
Musicians from Birmingham, West Midlands
Officers of the Order of the British Empire
Progressive rock guitarists
Progressive rock keyboardists
Rhythm guitarists
Slide guitarists
The Beatles
The Idle Race members
The Move members
Traveling Wilburys members